Vakkuruthi is a 1973 Indian Tamil-language drama film starring Jaishankar, Vennira Aadai Nirmala and Major Sundarrajan, with Cho Ramaswamy, Thengai Srinivasan and Anjali Devi appearing in supporting roles. It was released on 7 September 1973.

Plot

Cast 

Male cast
Jaishankar as Narendran
Major Sundarrajan as Nagarajan
Cho Ramaswamy as Mani
Thengai Srinivasan as Jambu
V. S. Raghavan as Moorthy
S. A. Ashokan ( guest role)

Female cast
Vennira Aadai Nirmala  as Radha
Anjali Devi  as Lakshmi
Manorama  as Ponni
Tambaram Lalitha as Narendran's adopted mother
Vijayarani as Jalaja
R. C. Priya as Dhanabakyam

Soundtrack 
The music was composed by Shankar–Ganesh.

References

External links 
 

1970s Tamil-language films
1973 drama films
Films scored by Shankar–Ganesh
Indian drama films